Amalia is a female given name, derived from the Germanic word amal, meaning "work, activity", specifically the woman's name Amalberga. Its popularity is attributed to the Belgian Saint Amalberga of Maubeuge. The origins of the name Amalia have often been associated with those of Emilia and Emily, both of which in fact originate from the Latin nomen Aemilia, or with Amalthea, which originated from the Greek name "tender goddess". In Greece, the name is celebrated on 10 July in honour of Saint Amalia.

Amalia has several variants, including Amelia in English, Amélia in Spanish, Amélie in French, Amalie in German, Amálie in Czech, and Amalka, a diminutive form of the name used in Slavic languages.

Notable people
 Amalia Assur (1803–1889), Sweden's first female dentist
 Amalia Bernabé (1895–1983), Argentine actress
 Amália Bezerédj (1804–1837), Hungarian writer
 Amalia Calzavara (born 1966), Italian sprint canoer
 Amalia Carneri (1875–1943), Austrian opera singer
 Cora Amalia Castilla (born 1961), Mexican politician
 Amalia Domingo Soler (1835–1909), Spanish novelist and feminist
 Amalia Eriksson (1824–1923), Swedish business person
 Amalia Ferraris (1828–1904), Italian dancer
 Amalia Fleming (1912–1986), Greek activist and politician
 Amalia Freud (1835–1930), mother of Sigmund
 Amalia Fuentes (1940–2019), Filipino actress
 Amalia García (born 1951), Mexican politician
 Amalia González Caballero de Castillo Ledón (1898–1986), Mexican Cabinet Minister and feminist
 Amalia Guglielminetti (1881–1941), Italian poet and writer
 Amalia von Helvig (1776–1831), German-Swedish artist, writer and socialite
 Amalia Hernández (1917–2000), Mexican ballet choreographer
 Amalia Holst (1758–1829), German writer and feminist
 Amalia de Isaura (1887–1971), Spanish actress
 Amalia Kahana-Carmon (born 1926), Israeli author and literary critic
 Amalia Kessler, American lawyer
 Amalia Küssner Coudert (1863–1932), American miniaturist
 María Amalia Lacroze de Fortabat (1921–2012), Argentine executive and philanthropist
 Amalia Lică (born 2009), Romanian rhythmic gymnast 
 Amalia Lindegren, (1814–1891), Swedish painter
 Amalia Puga de Losada (1866–1963), Peruvian writer, poet, novelist and essayist
 Amalia Matamoros (born 1989), winner of Miss World Costa Rica in 2008
 Amalberga of Maubeuge (died c. 690), Lotharingian saint (modern-day Belgium)
 Amalia Mendoza (1923–2001), Mexican actress and singer
 Amalia Mesa-Bains (born 1943), American psychologist and author
 Amalia Miranzo (1939–2014), Spanish politician
 Amalia Molina (1881–1956), Spanish tonadillera and dancer
 Amalia Pachelbel (1688–1723), German painter and engraver
 Amalia Paoli (1861–1941), Puerto Rican opera singer
 Amalia Pellegrini (1873–1958), Italian actress
 Amalia Pérez (born 1977), Mexican powerlifter
 Amalia Pica (born 1978), Argentine artist
 Amalia Planck (1834–1908), Swedish entrepreneur
 Amalia Del Ponte (born 1936), Italian artist and designer
 Amalia Post (1836-1897), American suffragist
 Amalia Ramírez (1834–1918), Spanish singer
 Amalia Riégo (1850–1926), Swedish opera singer
 Amália Rodrigues (1920–1999), Portuguese singer
 Amalia Sánchez Ariño (1839–1969), Argentine actress
 Amalia Sartori (born 1947), Italian politician
 Amalia Solórzano (1911–2008), former First Lady of Mexico
 Amalia Soraya (born 1984), Indonesian singer
 Amália Sterbinszky (born 1950), Hungarian handball player
 Amalia Streitel (1844–1911), German nun
 Amalia Tătăran (born 1994), Romanian fencer
 Amalia Ulman (born 1989), Argentine artist
 Amalia Uys (born 1984), South African actress
 Maria Amália Vaz de Carvalho (1847–1921), Portuguese writer and poet
 Amalia de la Vega (1919–2000), Uruguayan singer
 Amalia Yoo (born 2002), American actress

Nobility and royalty
 Princess Henriëtte Amalia of Anhalt-Dessau (1666–1726)
 Archduchess Maria Amalia of Austria (1724–1730)
 Archduchess Maria Amalia of Austria (1746–1804)
 Archduchess Maria Amalia of Austria (1780–1798)
 Maria Amalia, Holy Roman Empress (1701–1756)
 Anna Amalia of Baden-Durlach (1595–1651)
 Princess Maria Amalia of Bourbon-Two Sicilies (1818–1857)
 Amalia Margaretha van Brederode (1625–1663)
 Maria Amalia von Brühl (1736–1772)
 Duchess Anna Amalia of Brunswick-Wolfenbüttel (1739–1807)
 Amalia Catharina (1640–1697)
 Amalia of Cleves (1517–1586)
 Maria Amalia of Courland (1653–1711)
 Princess Frederica Amalia of Denmark (1649–1704)
 Amalia von Dyhrn (1790–1866)
 Amalia Golitsyna (1748–1806)
 Amalia von Hatzfeld (1560–1628)
 Hedvig Amalia Charlotta Klinckowström (1777–1810)
 Amalia Wilhelmina Königsmarck (1663–1740)
 Amalia de Llano (1822–1874)
 Sophia Amalia Marschalk (17th century)
 Józefina Amalia Mniszech (1752–1798)
 Maria Amalia of Naples and Sicily (1818–1857)
 Princess Amalia of Nassau-Dietz (1710–1777)
 Charlotte Amalia of Nassau-Dillenburg (1680–1738)
 Maria Amalia of Nassau-Dillenburg (1582–1635)
 Amalia of Neuenahr (1539–1602)
 Amalia of Oldenburg (1818–1875), Queen of Greece (1836 -1862)
 Catharina-Amalia, Princess of Orange (born 2003)
 Princess Anna Amalia of Prussia (1723–1787)
 Anna Amalia, Abbess of Quedlinburg (1723–1787)
 Princess Amalia of Saxe-Weimar-Eisenach (1830–1872)
 Amalia of Saxony, Duchess of Bavaria (1436–1501)
 Maria Amalia of Saxony (1724–1760)
 Maria Josepha Amalia of Saxony (1803–1829)
 Princess Maria Amalia of Saxony (1757–1831)
 Amalia of Solms-Braunfels (1602–1675)
 Infanta María Amalia of Spain (1779–1798)
 Princess Amalia of Sweden (1805–1853)

See also 
 Amalia (disambiguation)
 Princess Amalia (disambiguation)

References

German feminine given names
Feminine given names
Italian feminine given names
Spanish feminine given names
Hungarian feminine given names
Danish feminine given names
Norwegian feminine given names
Icelandic feminine given names
Swedish feminine given names
Finnish feminine given names
Romanian feminine given names
Portuguese feminine given names
Greek feminine given names
Dutch feminine given names
Arabic feminine given names